
This is a list of players who graduated from the Challenge Tour in 2021. The top 20 players on the Challenge Tour rankings in 2021 earned European Tour cards for 2022.

* European Tour rookie in 2022
† First-time full member, but ineligible for Rookie of the Year award
T = Tied
 The player retained his European Tour card for 2023 (finished inside the top 117).
 The player did not retain his European Tour card for 2023, but retained conditional status (finished between 118 and 155, inclusive).
 The player did not retain his European Tour card for 2023 (finished outside the top 155).

Wins on the European Tour in 2022

Runner-up finishes on the European Tour in 2022

References

Challenge Tour
European Tour
Challenge Tour Graduates
Challenge Tour Graduates